Haw Creek Leather Company is a historic factory building located at Columbus, Indiana.  It was built between 1914 and 1916, and is a two-story, brick industrial building.  It sits on a raised basement and has a flat roof.  It features arched window openings.  The Haw Creek Leather Company operated a tannery at this location until 1955.

It was added to the National Register of Historic Places in 1998.

References

External links

Tanneries
Columbus, Indiana
Industrial buildings and structures on the National Register of Historic Places in Indiana
Industrial buildings completed in 1916
Buildings and structures in Bartholomew County, Indiana
National Register of Historic Places in Bartholomew County, Indiana